In physics, a paste is a substance that behaves as a solid until a sufficiently large load or stress is applied, at which point it flows like a fluid. In rheological terms, a paste is an example of a Bingham plastic fluid.

Pastes typically consist of a suspension of granular material in a background fluid.  The individual grains are jammed together like sand on a beach, forming a disordered, glassy or amorphous structure, and giving pastes their solid-like character.  It is this "jamming together" that gives pastes some of their most unusual properties; this causes paste to demonstrate properties of fragile matter. 

Examples include starch pastes, toothpaste, mustard, and putty.

In pharmacology, paste is a basic pharmaceutical form. It consists of a fatty base (e.g., petroleum jelly) and at least 25% of a solid substance (e.g., zinc oxide). Pharmaceutical pastes are typically intended for external application to the skin. They are usually thick and do not melt at physiologic temperatures.

Properties of paste

References 

Materials
Drug delivery devices
Dosage forms